In a cellular automaton, an oscillator is a pattern that returns to its original state, in the same orientation and position, after a finite number of generations. Thus the evolution of such a pattern repeats itself indefinitely. Depending on context, the term may also include spaceships as well.

The smallest number of generations it takes before the pattern returns to its initial condition is called the period of the oscillator. An oscillator with a period of 1 is usually called a still life, as such a pattern never changes. Sometimes, still lifes are not taken to be oscillators. Another common stipulation is that an oscillator must be finite.

Examples
In Conway's Game of Life, finite oscillators are known to exist for all periods except 19 and 41. Additionally, until July 2022, the only known examples for period 34 were considered trivial because they consisted of essentially separate components that oscillate at smaller periods. For instance, one can create a period 34 oscillator by placing period 2 and period 17 oscillators so that they do not interact. An oscillator is considered non-trivial if it contains at least one cell that oscillates at the necessary period.

External links
List of notable known oscillators at the LifeWiki
A collection of oscillators in the Game of Life (zip file)

Cellular automaton patterns